Charlotte Ward (born 1992) is a British orienteering competitor. She was part of the British team that came second in the sprint relay at the 2022 World Orienteering Championships. Her team included Megan Carter Davies, Kris Jones and Ralph Street.

Ward competes for HALO orienteering club. She has won the sprint discipline at both the British Orienteering Championships and the JK Orienteering Festival.

References

1992 births
Living people
British orienteers
Female orienteers
Foot orienteers
World Orienteering Championships medalists
20th-century British women
21st-century British women
Competitors at the 2022 World Games
World Games medalists in orienteering
World Games bronze medalists